The House of Orléans-Braganza (Portuguese: Casa de Orléans e Bragança) is a Brazilian noble house of Portuguese and French origin. It is a cadet branch of the House of Braganza, of Portugal and later Brazil, and the House of Orléans, of France. The house was founded with the marriage between Isabel of Braganza, Princess Imperial of Brazil, and Prince Gaston of Orléans, Count of Eu.

The house was never a reigning house, as Brazil's pure Braganza monarch, Pedro II, was deposed in 1889. The House's members are the current claimants to the Brazilian throne since 1921 as part of the Imperial House of Brazil.

History

In 1864, the Emperor Pedro II of Brazil was looking for a match to his daughters. The Emperor's sister, Princess of Joinville suggested her nephews, Prince Gaston, Count of Eu, and Prince Ludwig August of Saxe-Coburg and Gotha, both grandsons of King Louis Philippe of France, as suitable choices for the imperial princesses. The two young men traveled to Brazil in August 1864 so that the prospective brides and grooms could meet before a final agreement to the marriage. Isabel and Leopoldina were not informed until Gaston and August were mid-Atlantic. Arriving in early September, Gaston described the princesses as "ugly", but thought Isabel less so than her sister. For her part, Isabel in her own words "began to feel a great and tender love" for Gaston.[65] The two couples: Gaston and Isabel;  August and Leopoldina; were engaged on 18 September. On 15 October 1864 at Rio de Janeiro, Prince Gaston married Isabel, Princess Imperial of Brazil and heiress of the Empire.

It was from that marriage the royal house of Orléans-Braganza was formed. The couple had 3 surviving sons which were the first to use the surname Orléans-Braganza: Pedro de Alcântara, Prince of Grão-Pará, Prince Luís and Prince Antônio. Both Prince Pedro and Prince Luís have children.

Today they are the present claimants to the throne of the former Empire of Brazil, which became extinct with the Brazilian proclamation of the republic, on 15 November 1889 after a military coup d'état headed by Marshall Deodoro da Fonseca, the 1st President of Brazil. After the death of Princess Isabel on 1921, the House of Orléans-Braganza became the claimant of the Brazilian throne under Prince Pedro Henrique of Orléans-Braganza.

Exile

On 15 November 1889 a republican coup d'ètat took place in Rio de Janeiro deposing the old Emperor Pedro II and proclaiming the exile of the Brazilian Imperial Family. The imperial family arrived in Lisbon on 7 December 1889. The Orleans-Braganza family moved to southern Spain. Further bad news came from Brazil, as the new government abolished the imperial family's allowances, their only substantial source of income, and declared the family banished. On the back of a large loan from a Portuguese businessman, the imperial family moved into the Hotel Beau Séjour at Cannes.

In early 1890, Princess Isabel and Prince Gaston moved into a private villa, which was far cheaper than the hotel, but the Emperor refused to accompany them and remained at the Beau Séjour, later moving to Paris where he died in 1891. Prince Louis, Duke of Nemours, Gaston's father, provided them with a monthly allowance. By September, they had taken a villa near Versailles and their sons were enrolled in Parisian schools. Isabel and Gaston purchased a villa in Boulogne-sur-Seine, where they lived an essentially quiet life. Attempts by Brazilian monarchists to restore the crown were unsuccessful, and Isabel lent them only half-hearted support. She thought military action unwise and unwelcome. She correctly assumed that it was unlikely to succeed.

When Gaston's father died in 1896, an inheritance assured him and Isabel financial security. Their three sons enrolled at a military school in Vienna, and Isabel continued her charitable work associated with the Catholic Church. In 1905, Gaston purchased the Château d'Eu in Normandy, the former home of her grandfather King Louis Philippe I and where he was raised, and the couple furnished it with items received from Brazil in the early 1890s.

In 1907, Prince Luís of Orléans-Braganza, Isabel and Gaston's second son, planned an ambitious project to defy the decree banishing the imperial family from Brazil by traveling to Rio de Janeiro. His sudden arrival created an uproar in the old imperial capital because the arrival was widely circulated in newspapers. It also caused difficulties for Brazilian politicians by placing the imperial family at the center of attention and many Brazilians went to welcome him. However, Luís was prevented from disembarking and was not allowed to set foot on his native land by the republican government. Nonetheless, he sent his mother a telegram saying: "Hindered of disembarking by the Government, I greet the Redeemer of Slaves on the bay of Guanabara in the eve of May 13."

Next year, following the announcement of imminent, morganatic marriage between his older brother Pedro de Alcântara, Prince of Grão-Pará and Countess Elisabeth Dobržensky de Dobrženicz, Prince Luís, who assumed the title of Prince Imperial of Brazil, became the heir and married Princess Maria di Grazia of Bourbon-Two Sicilies, his cousin. Both couples had many children. Prince Antônio Gastão of Orléans-Braganza didn't marry.

Soon before the World War I, Princes Luis and Antônio, members of the Austro-Hungarian Army with the permission of their uncle-grandpa, the Emperor Franz Joseph, disconnected from the military. With the war, they tried to enlist the French Army to protect the fatherland of their father, which they adopted but they both was denied because they were part of the French Royal Family. The Princes then joined the British armed forces. Prince Antônio died in 1918, soon after the end of the war in an airplane crash. The serious illness contracted in the trenches proved resistant to all treatments and his health gradually deteriorated until the death of Prince Luis 1920.

In 1920, the republican government headed by President Epitácio Pessoa lifted the imperial family's banishment. The next year Prince Gaston and Prince Pedro de Alcântara traveled back to Brazil after 31 years of imposed exile for the reburial of the Emperor and the Empress in Cathedral of Petrópolis. Isabel, the Emperor's daughter and heir and de jure Empress of Brazil was too ill to travel and died in this same year. She was the last pure Braganza heir to the Brazilian throne. After her death, the claim passed to her grandson Prince Pedro Henrique of Orléans-Braganza, Luis's eldest son. The following year, Prince Gaston, Count of Eu, eventually died a natural death during a journey that would take him back to Brazil to celebrate the first centenary of independence.

While the rest of the Imperial Family remain living in France, in the early 1930s, Prince Pedro acquired the Grão Pará Palace, a former palace of his family, and moved to Petrópolis, back in  Brazil. At the time, his eldest daughter Princess Isabelle of Orléans-Braganza married Henri, count of Paris, heir to the French throne. Prince Pedro died in 1940 in his palace, being the only Prince of Brazil to die back in his fatherland. Her another daughter Princess Maria Francisca of Orléans-Braganza, Duchess of Braganza married Duarte Nuno, Duke of Braganza, heir to the Portuguese throne in 1942.

In 1937, the son of Luís Prince Pedro Henrique marries Princess Maria Elisabeth of Bavaria, granddaughter of Ludwig III, the last King of Bavaria in Germany. They fled the country to avoid the Nazi and went to live in a palace in France where they start to have children. The couple moved to Brazil in 1945 soon after the end of the war giving a definite end to the exile.

Renunciation and Division

In 1908, Pedro de Alcântara, Prince of Grão-Pará wanted to marry Countess Elisabeth Dobržensky de Dobrženicz(1875–1951) who, although a noblewoman of the Kingdom of Bohemia, did not belong to a royal or reigning dynasty. Although the constitution of the Brazilian Empire did not require a dynast to marry equally, his mother ruled that the marriage would not be valid dynastically for the Brazilian succession, and as a result he renounced his rights to the throne of Brazil on 30 October 1908: To solemnize this, Dom Pedro, aged thirty-three, signed the document translated here:

This renunciation was followed by a letter from Isabel to royalists in Brazil:

After Prince Pedro's renunciation, he lost every royal title he had and his dynastic rights as heir of his mother passed to his brother, Prince Luís of Orléans-Braganza, who became Prince Imperial of Brazil. However, years later, after Pedro's death in 1940, his eldest son did not accept his father's resignation and again claimed the Brazilian throne in conflict with Prince Pedro Henrique of Orléans-Braganza, son and heir of Prince Luís, dead in 1920. Thus began a dispute for the crown of Brazil. The descendants of Prince Pedro became known as the Petrópolis Branch, and the descendants of Prince Luís as the Vassouras Branch.

The Family Pact of 1909

After the resignation of Pedro de Alcântara, Prince of Grão-Pará on 1908 to marry a Bohemian noblewoman, he lost his rights and his titles as Prince of Brazil. To maintain the princely status, his father, Prince Gaston of Orleans, as former member of the French Royal Family sought the head of this dynasty, Prince Philippe, Duke of Orléans.

Recognizing the principle of pérégrinité and therefore the impossibility for foreign princes to claim the crown of France, the Orléans claimants and their supporters consider excluded from the succession to the throne the foreign descendants of King Louis-Philippe I: the Brazilian Orléans-Braganza (descendants of the Comte d'Eu) and the Spanish Orléans-Galliera (descendants of Antoine, Duke of Montpensier).

The agreement of the  family in 1909, known as the "Family Pact" (Pacte de Famille) confirms the exclusion of members of these branches from the succession on grounds of pérégrinité. Further, it "takes note" of a written promise given by the Count of Eu and his son to refrain from asserting any claim to the Crown of France and to the position of Head of the House of France until the total extinction of all the other dynastic branches of the House of France (the Montpensiers were already deemed excluded). According to the pact, the House of France recognized the Brazilian House of Orléans-Braganza as a cadet branch and create to his member the French title of Prince of Orléans-Braganza.

Alfred de Gramont alleged in his diary, L'ami du Prince, journal of a novel, published by Eric Mension Rigau-Fayard in 2011) that this decision was made by the Orléans for two reasons: first, the desire of other dynasts to exclude the Comte d'Eu and the princes of Orléans-Braganza (who became heirs presumptive to the Empire of Brazil), and second, the influence of French nationalism. However, exclusion from the succession as a consequence of permanent emigration to Brazil had been acknowledged and accepted in writing by the Count of Eu prior to his marriage to the Princess Imperial of Brazil.

Members

Vassouras line

Prince Luís of Orléans-Braganza (1878–1920), second son of Princess Isabel, he became Head of the Imperial House of Brazil after her death in 1921.
Prince Dom Pedro Henrique of Orléans-Braganza (1909–1981)
Prince Dom Luiz of Orléans-Braganza (1938–2022): Eldest son of Prince Dom Pedro Henrique, became Head of the Imperial Family after his death.
Prince Eudes of Orléans-Braganza (1939–2020): Renounced his rights of succession to the Brazilian Throne in 1966.
Prince Dom Bertrand of Orléans-Braganza (b. 1941) : Became Head of the Imperial Family after Prince Luiz's death.
Princess Isabel of Orléans-Braganza (1944–2017)
Prince Pedro de Alcântara of Orléans-Braganza (b. 1945): Renounced his rights in 1972.
Prince Fernando of Orléans-Braganza (b. 1948): Renounced his rights in 1972.
Prince Dom Antônio of Orléans-Braganza (b. 1951)
Prince Pedro Luiz of Orléans-Braganza (1983–2009): Died in the crash of the Air France Flight 447.
Princess Amélia of Orléans-Braganza (b. 1984): Renounced her rights in 2014.
Prince Rafael Antônio of Orléans-Braganza (b. 1986)
Princess Maria Gabriela of Orléans-Braganza (b. 1989)
Princess Eleonora of Orléans-Braganza (b. 1953), Princess of Ligne
Prince Francisco of Orléans-Braganza (b. 1955): Renounced his rights in 1980.
Prince Alberto of Orléans-Braganza (b. 1957): Renounced his rights in 1982.
Princess Maria Teresa (b. 1959): Renounced her rights in 1995.
Princess Maria Gabriela (b. 1959): Renounced her rights in 2003.
Prince Luiz Gastão of Orléans-Braganza (1911–1931).
Princess Pia Maria of Orléans-Braganza (1913–2000).

Petrópolis line

Pedro de Alcântara, Prince of Grão-Pará (1875–1940), the first son of Isabel, had renounced all rights to the Brazilian Throne for himself and his descendants. The validity of the renunciation was disputed by his son Dom Pedro Gastão after his death.
Prince Dom Pedro Gastão of Orléans-Braganza (1913–2007)
Prince Dom Pedro Carlos of Orléans-Braganza (Born in 1945): eldest son of Dom Pedro Gastão. He doesn't put in question the validity of the renunciation. Contrariwise, he declared himself a republican. 
Prince Dom Pedro Thiago of Orléans-Braganza (born in 1979): Heir of Dom Pedro Carlos.
Prince Dom Filipe Rodrigo of Orléans-Braganza (born in 1982)
Princess Maria da Glória, Duchess of Segorbe (b. 1946), former Crown Princess of Yugoslavia.
Prince Alfonso Duarte of Orléans-Braganza (b. 1948)
Prince Manuel Álvaro of Orléans-Braganza (b. 1949)
Princess Cristina Maria of Orléans-Braganza (b. 1950), Princess Sapieha-Rozánski
Prince Francisco Humberto of Orléans-Braganza (b. 1956)
Princess Isabelle of Orléans-Braganza (1911–2003), Countess of Paris.
Princess Maria Francisca of Orléans-Braganza (1914–1968), Duchess of Braganza.
Prince João Maria of Orléans-Braganza (1916–2005).
Prince João Henrique of Orléans-Braganza (b. 1954).
Princess Teresa Teodora of Orléans-Braganza (1919–2011).

Genealogy

Genealogical tree of the House of Orléans-Braganza, from its origin to the current claimants:

Vassouras line 

The descendants of Prince Luís of Orléans-Braganza

Petrópolis line 

The descendants of Pedro de Alcântara, Prince of Grão-Pará

Armorial

Estates and properties

Most members of the Imperial House live in rented apartments in wealthy neighbourhoods, private mansions or in Europe. Some of them like Eleanora, Princess of Ligne, for having married members of other royal houses live in their palaces.

See also

Brazilian Imperial Family
List of Brazilian monarchs

References 
Notes

Bibliography

External links 

CoinsHome - Family Tree of the House of Braganza

 
Brazil history-related lists
Brazilian monarchy
1864 establishments in Brazil